The 1974–75 NCAA Division I men's basketball season began in November 1974, progressed through the regular season and conference tournaments, and concluded with the 1975 NCAA Men's Division I Basketball Tournament Championship Game on March 31, 1975, at the San Diego Sports Arena in San Diego, California. The UCLA Bruins won their tenth NCAA national championship with a 92–85 victory over the Kentucky Wildcats.

Season headlines 

 The NCAA Division I men's basketball tournament expanded from 40 to 48 teams.
 In the Pacific 8 Conference, UCLA won its ninth of what would ultimately be 13 consecutive conference titles.

Season outlook

Pre-season polls 

The top 20 from the AP Poll during the pre-season.

Conference membership changes

Regular season

Conference winners and tournaments 

From 1975 to 1982, the Eastern College Athletic Conference (ECAC), a loosely organized sports federation of Northeastern colleges and universities, organized Division I ECAC regional tournaments for those of its members that were independents in basketball. Each 1975 tournament winner received an automatic bid to the 1975 NCAA Men's Division I Basketball Tournament in the same way that the tournament champions of conventional athletic conferences did.

Informal championships

Statistical leaders

Post-season tournaments

NCAA tournament

Final Four 

 Third Place – Louisville 96, Syracuse 88

National Invitation tournament

Semifinals & finals 

 Third Place – Oregon 80, St. John's 76

Awards

Consensus All-American teams

Major player of the year awards 

 Naismith Award: David Thompson, NC State
 Helms Player of the Year: David Thompson, NC State
 Associated Press Player of the Year: David Thompson, NC State
 UPI Player of the Year: David Thompson, NC State
 NABC Player of the Year: David Thompson, NC State
 Oscar Robertson Trophy (USBWA): David Thompson, NC State
 Adolph Rupp Trophy: David Thompson, NC State
 Sporting News Player of the Year: David Thompson, NC State

Major coach of the year awards 

 Associated Press Coach of the Year: Bob Knight, Indiana
 Henry Iba Award (USBWA): Bob Knight, Indiana
 NABC Coach of the Year: Bob Knight, Indiana
 UPI Coach of the Year: Bob Knight, Indiana
 Sporting News Coach of the Year: Bob Knight, Indiana

Other major awards 

 Frances Pomeroy Naismith Award (Best player under 6'0): Monte Towe, NC State
 Robert V. Geasey Trophy (Top player in Philadelphia Big 5): Ron Haigler, Penn
 NIT/Haggerty Award (Top player in New York City metro area): Phil Sellers, Rutgers

Coaching changes 

A number of teams changed coaches during the season and after it ended.

References